The 1963 Little All-America college football team is composed of college football players from small colleges and universities who were selected by the Associated Press (AP) as the best players at each position. For 1963, the AP selected three teams of 11 players each, with no separate defensive platoons.

Quarterback George Bork of Northern Illinois was the only repeater from 1962. Bork set 14 national passing records during his time at Northern Illinois, including single-season records of 3,077 passing yards, 374 completions, 32 touchdowns, and 341.9 passing yards per game. He was later inducted into the College Football Hall of Fame.

End Robert Cherry of Wittenberg had 45 receptions for 886 yards and 13 touchdowns. Back Mike Brown of Delaware averaged 104.8 rushing yards per game and averaged 6.3 yards per carry.

First team
 Back - George Bork, Northern Illinois
 Back - Mike Brown, Delaware
 Back - Sid Blanks, Texas A&I
 Back - Martin Agnew, Sewanee
 End - Robert Cherry, Wittenberg
 End - Jerry Cole, Southwest Texas
 Tackle - Paul Graham, UMass
 Tackle - Neil Reuter, North Dakota
 Guard - Ralph Bauman, Puget Sound
 Guard - Greg Van Orden, Appalachian
 Center - Richard Dean, Depauw

Second team
 Back - Jimmy Baker, East Tennessee
 Back - Mickey Hergert, Lewis & Clark
 Back - Wayne Rasmussen, South Dakota State
 Back - Jerry Wonders, Luther
 End - Neal Petties, San Diego State
 End - John Mutchler, Western Kentucky
 Tackle - Jack Peters, Omaha
 Tackle - John McDowell, Saint John's (Minnesota)
 Guard - William Crowell, Juniata
 Guard - Bob Griffin, San Francisco State
 Center - Orville Hudson, East Texas

Third team
 Back - Jack Ankerson, Ripon
 Back - Jim Switzer, College of Emporia
 Back - Jim Holder, Panhandle A&M
 Back - Charles Reed, Whitworth
 End - Jim Hollingsworth, Portland
 End - Wayne Howell, Missouri Valley
 Tackle - Dale Weishahn, UC Davis
 Tackle - Joe Davis, Northeastern
 Guard - Wayne Farmer, Chattanooga
 Guard - Lee Grimm, Butler
 Center - Frank Galloway, East Carolina

See also
 1963 College Football All-America Team

References

Little All-America college football team
Little All-America college football team
Little All-America college football teams